A clause is a type of construct in grammar.

Clause may also refer to:
 Clause (logic), a disjunction of literals in logic
 Clause, a constituent component of statements and queries in SQL
 Legal clause, an individually designated provision in a contract, regulation or statute

People
 Frederick Clause (1791–1852), surgeon, painter and early explorer of Western Australia
 Marcel Clause (1927–2004), Belgian judo educator, referee, former athlete, former coach
 William Lionel Clause (1887–1946), English artist

See also
 
 
 Santa Claus (disambiguation)